Scott Aharoni (born January 4, 1994) is an American film producer and director. He is a co-Founder of Cinegryphon Entertainment, an American independent entertainment company specializing in film and television development, production and financing.

Early life and education
Aharoni was born in Great Neck, New York, on January 4, 1994. He grew up studying the art of sleight of hand magic and even performed on stage and at special events. He was introduced to moviemaking in middle school.

During his time in high school, he participated in the school district's public television news station, which featured a full production TV studio and mobile film truck. He directed and produced several forms of content under the GNPS TV banner, including the school's morning news show, sporting events, concerts, and graduation ceremonies. After graduating from the William A. Shine Great Neck South High School, he attended Hofstra University on a Presidential Scholarship. He pursued his bachelor of science in film and television production and graduated with summa cum laude Latin Honors from the Honors College at Hofstra University in 2016.

While doing his bachelor's, Aharoni worked as a freelance director and editor, working on experimental short films, commercials, and music videos.

In 2015, in his final year at Hofstra University, Aharoni produced, directed, and edited his senior thesis short film, Bardo.

Bardo won the 1st Annual Golden Lion Award, which was awarded to the filmmaker of the year, at the 20th Annual Hofstra Film Festival in 2016. It also won awards for best director, producer, and editor. Bardo premiered at The Dolby Theatre in New York City in 2016.

Career
After graduating from Hofstra University, Aharoni continued to work as a freelance director and producer. In 2017 he directed, produced, and edited the short, The Untimely Gift. The film premiered at the Directors Guild of America Theatre in New York City and received critical praise.

In August 2020, Aharoni directed, produced, and edited his next short film, Leylak, during the midst of the COVID-19 pandemic. The film was written by Mustafa Kaymak and executive produced by Colman Domingo and Oscar nominee Doug Roland. The film held its world premiere at the Tribeca Film Festival on June 12, 2021, and won the Special Jury Prize. In 2020, he served as the Executive Producer for the film The Criminals, which was shortlisted for the 94th Academy Awards.

Aharoni co-founded the entertainment production company based in New York City, Cinegryphon Entertainment, with Mustafa Kaymak and Sinan Eczacibasi in September 2021. He is currently involved in several projects under the banner of Cinegryphon Entertainment, including a feature narrative, The Shallow Tale of a Writer Who Decided to Write about a Serial Killer by writer and director Tolga Karacelik, a feature-length adaptation of the Sundance-winning short film Green, and a documentary called The Walk by Oscar nominee Tamara Kotevska.

The production house is also planning to produce a feature adaptation of the classic novel, The Blue Castle by Lucy Maud Montgomery.

Filmography

Film

Recognition
Aharoni's thesis film, Bardo, in addition to winning at the Hofstra Film Festival, won several other awards, including the Independent Spirit Award at the Sedona International Film Festival, Grand Jury Prize at the Snowtown Film Festival, and the Audience Choice Award at the Downtown Urban Arts International Film Festival.

His film, The Untimely Gift, was selected for the Flickers' Rhode Island International Film Festival and the Bermuda International Film Festival.

Aharoni served as the Executive Producer for the film Green, which won the Short Film Jury Award, U.S. Fiction at the 2019 Sundance Film Festival.

He also served as the Executive Producer for The Criminals, which was shortlisted for an Oscar nomination in the Live Action Short Film category in 2022.

Another film, Leylak, won the Special Jury Prize at the Tribeca Film Festival in 2021. Leylak also won awards at the Galway Film Fleadh, Flickers' Rhode Island International Film Festival, Short Shorts Film Festival & Asia, and Leiden Film Festival.

References

External links

American film directors
American film producers
1994 births
Living people
William A. Shine Great Neck South High School alumni
People from Great Neck, New York
Hofstra University alumni